The H4 Handy Recorder is a handheld digital audio recorder from Zoom, featuring built-in condenser microphones in an X-Y stereo pattern, priced from around US$280 depending upon memory capacity .

Recordings are stored on an SD card (128 MB supplied), or via a USB cable to a computer running digital audio workstation software (Cubase LE supplied).

Applications and recording formats 

The H4 can record in stereo or four-track mode. In stereo mode WAV or compressed (MP3) files may be made. A 2GB card will store 95 hours of speech-quality or 3 hours of CD-quality recording. With device firmware from version 2.0, SDHC cards up to 32GB in size are supported, storing 16 hours at the highest-quality setting (uncompressed PCM WAV, 24 bit, 96 kHz, stereo).

Basic four-track recordings can be made in the field with the built-in microphones and two additional input ports which accept external signal sources via XLR or 1/4-inch connectors.

Stereo mode

In stereo mode, the user has a wide choice of sound quality, with lower quality requiring less storage space. Only 44.1 kHz 16-bit recordings can be imported into four-track mode. All stereo recordings share a single folder, and on playback are sequenced as one continuous output stream with no pause between files.

Stereo recording can use the built-in microphones or external input via 1/4-inch or XLR plugs.

4-track mode

Four-track recordings can be made of one or two tracks at a time. When recording in stereo, only tracks 1 and 2, or 3 and 4, can be chosen. Four-track recordings are limited to 16-bit/44.1 kHz WAV files. WAV recordings made in stereo mode can be imported into a project folder.

When recording on one or two tracks, the other tracks may be played back simultaneously (see multi-track recording). Each track can be individually panned, to create a stereo image.

Any or all tracks can be mixed down to a stereo bounce file. This can be the last step in mixing, or an intermediate step to free up other tracks.

Effects 

The H4 incorporates a 32-bit DSP that provides various effects as well as modelling of different types of microphone and guitar amplifiers. Up to 60 effects patches can be stored.

Internal clock issue

It has been reported that all H4 recorders have a serious flaw: the internal clock is not precise, with a typical error of a few seconds per hour. As a result, recorded audio is out of sync with other devices (e.g., camcorders) and has to be stretched in order to achieve synchronization.

See also

Zoom H2 Handy Recorder
Zoom H4n

References

External links

Pro Audio Review by Bruce Bartlett, November 2005
O'Reilly Digital Media Review by Mark Nelson, February 2007; the same reviewer also tested the Edirol R-09 and M-Audio MicroTrack recorders
Videomaker Review by Brian Peterson, March 2007
Sonic Studios Review The reviewer measures noise/frequency performance of the H4.

Zoom Corporation
Multitrack recording
Digital audio recording